Manuela Gostner (born 19 May 1984 in Bolzano) is a racing driver from Italy.

Biography
A member of the Gostner family synonymous with Ferrari Challenge competition, Manuela entered the European championship with encouragement from her brother David at the end of the 2014 season. She became a regular name in the amateur Coppa Shell class over the coming years, winning two races in 2018. Having entered the 2017 GT4 European Series Northern Cup to earn an FIA Bronze Licence, she was picked up by Kessel Racing to make up an all-female entry into the European Le Mans Series, with plans to make the grid for the 24 Hours of Le Mans. The team, consisting of Rahel Frey and Michelle Gatting, finished fourth in the GTE championship with two second places and scored entry into the 2019 24 Hours of Le Mans, finishing 9th in class and 39th overall.

Prior to her motorsport career, Gostner was a professional volleyball player.

Personal life
Manuela Gostner is also a mother

Career results

Overview

Ferrari Challenge Finali Mondiali results

Complete 24 Hours of Le Mans results

References

External links

 Profile at Driver Database
 Official website

Italian racing drivers
1984 births
24 Hours of Le Mans drivers
Living people
Sportspeople from Bolzano
24H Series drivers
Italian female racing drivers
European Le Mans Series drivers
Le Mans Cup drivers
Iron Lynx drivers
Ferrari Challenge drivers